Biscay was an Australian Thoroughbred racehorse. As a two-year-old 1965 he won the Maribyrnong Plate by eight lengths.

Background
A son of Star Kingdom from Magic Symbol by Makarpura (GB) he was a brother to Star of Heaven and Tattenham (9 wins and $26,845). Biscay was bred by Stanley Wootton at Barramul Stud in New South Wales.

Angus Armanasco, who was the leading trainer of two-year-olds in Melbourne for many years, declared Biscay was a star before the colt raced.

Racing career
Biscay was undefeated as a three-year-old. An exceptionally speedy type, who usually jumped from the barrier clear of his rivals, Biscay had a short but successful racing career. From 8 starts he recorded 6 wins and was unplaced twice. His wins included the VRC Maribyrnong Plate, Merson Cooper Stakes and the VATC Debutant Stakes, all good quality races.

Stud record
He was syndicated and in 1969 retired to stud to stand at the Bhima Stud, Scone, New South Wales. In 1972-73 Biscay was the leading first season sire. A quality sire in his own right he passed on his speed to his progeny which included the stakes winners:
 Belle Chanson (won SAJC Australasian Oaks)
 Biscadale (VATC One Thousand Guineas)
 Bletchingly (won AJC The Galaxy, sired the champion Kingston Town), 
 Bounding Away, won 6 G1 races, including the STC Golden Slipper Stakes
 Lowan Star, won QTC Queensland Oaks and AJC Oaks 
 Mahaasin (NZ ) won VATC Blue Diamond Stakes
 Marscay, winner of the 1982 Golden Slipper Stakes and a leading sire 
 Scarlet Bisque (VATC Oakleigh Plate) 
 Shaybisc (AJC Sires Produce Stakes) 
 Zephyr Bay (VATC Oakleigh Plate).

Biscay was among the leading sires in Australia four times and Champion Juvenile Sire in 1981-82 and 1985-86. He has also proved to be a successful broodmare sire.

He died on 7 November 1987 having sired 300 individual winners (including 40 stakeswinners with 81 stakeswins) worth more than A$5.5 million in stakesmoney.

References

External links
 Biscay's pedigree and a photo

1965 racehorse births
1987 racehorse deaths
Racehorses bred in Australia
Racehorses trained in Australia
Thoroughbred family 2-o